Henry of Isenburg-Covern (German: Heinrich von Isenburg-Covern) was the Count of Isenburg-Covern from 1229 until 1263.

1263 deaths
House of Isenburg
Year of birth unknown